The Ghost Writer (released as The Ghost in the United Kingdom and Ireland) is a 2010 neo-noir political thriller film directed by Roman Polanski. The film is an adaptation of a 2007 Robert Harris novel, The Ghost, with the screenplay written by Polanski and Harris. It stars Ewan McGregor, Pierce Brosnan, Kim Cattrall, and Olivia Williams.

The film was a critical and commercial success and won numerous cinematic awards including Best Director for Polanski at the 60th Berlin International Film Festival and also at the 23rd European Film Awards in 2010.

Plot

A ghostwriter is hired by a publishing firm to complete the autobiography of former British Prime Minister Adam Lang. The Ghost's predecessor and Lang's aide, Mike McAra, has recently died in a drowning accident. The Ghost travels to Old Haven on Martha's Vineyard, Massachusetts, where Lang and his wife Ruth are staying.

Former British Foreign Secretary Richard Rycart accuses Lang of authorizing the illegal seizure of suspected terrorists. Lang faces prosecution by the International Criminal Court unless he stays in the United States. While Lang is in Washington, D.C., the Ghost finds an envelope containing photographs and a phone number in Lang’s old room. The Ghost calls the number and discovers it belongs to Rycart.

Ruth reveals Lang and McAra had argued the night before the latter's death. Ruth and the Ghost have a one night stand.

The Ghost takes McAra's car with the intent of returning to his hotel, but follows the pre-programmed directions on the car's sat-nav instead. The car takes the Ghost to Belmont, home of Professor Paul Emmett.

Emmett denies anything more than a cursory acquaintance with Lang, despite several pictures of the pair together. When the Ghost tells Emmett the sat-nav proves McAra visited him the night he died, Emmett denies meeting McAra and becomes evasive.

Someone follows the Ghost on the way back to Martha’s Vineyard. With no one else to turn to, the Ghost asks Rycart for help. The Ghost researches links between Emmett and a military contractor as well as the CIA. Rycart reveals McAra gave him documents linking Lang to so-called "torture flights", in which terrorist suspects were placed on private jets to be tortured while airborne.

Rycart claims that McAra found new evidence, which he wrote about in the "beginnings" of the manuscript. The men cannot, however, find anything in the early pages. The Ghost discusses Emmett's relationship with Lang, while Rycart recounts how Lang's decisions as Prime Minister uniformly benefited US interests.

The Ghost confronts Lang and accuses him of being a CIA agent recruited by Emmett. Shortly after, Lang is assassinated by a man whose son died "in one of Lang's illegal wars". The assassin is shot dead by Lang's bodyguards. The Ghost is asked to complete the book for posthumous publication.

At the book's launch party in London, the Ghost learns that Emmett, who is in attendance, was Ruth's tutor when she was at Harvard. The Ghost discovers the message in the original manuscript: "Lang's wife Ruth was recruited as a CIA agent by Professor Paul Emmett of Harvard University." The Ghost passes a note to Ruth revealing his discovery. She unfolds the note and is devastated. She sees the Ghost raising a glass to her. The Ghost leaves the party and as he crosses the street, a car accelerates in his direction, and a thud is heard. Witnesses react in horror, and the pages containing McAra's manuscript scatter in the wind.

Cast

 Ewan McGregor as the Ghost, the unnamed ghostwriter
 Pierce Brosnan as Adam Lang, a former British Prime Minister
 Kim Cattrall as Amelia Bly, Lang's personal assistant
 Olivia Williams as Ruth Lang, Lang's wife
 Tom Wilkinson as Paul Emmett, a professor at Harvard Law School
 Timothy Hutton as Sidney Kroll, Lang's American lawyer
 Jon Bernthal as Rick Ricardelli, the ghostwriter's agent
 Tim Preece as Roy, managing director of Rhinehart's London business
 Robert Pugh as Richard Rycart, UN Envoy and former British foreign secretary
 David Rintoul as the Stranger, a grieving father who lost his son during the War in Afghanistan
 Eli Wallach as the Old Man at Martha's Vineyard

In addition, James Belushi plays John Maddox, Rhinehart's New York executive.

Production

Polanski had originally teamed with Robert Harris for a film of Harris's novel Pompeii, but the project was cancelled because of the looming actors' strike that autumn.

Polanski and Harris then turned to Harris' current best seller, The Ghost. They co-wrote a script and in November 2007, just after the book's release, Polanski announced filming for autumn 2008. In June 2008, Nicolas Cage, Pierce Brosnan, Tilda Swinton, and Kim Cattrall were announced as the stars. Production was then postponed by a number of months, with Ewan McGregor and Olivia Williams replacing Cage and Swinton, respectively, as a result.

The film finally began production in February 2009 in Germany, at the Babelsberg Studios in Potsdam. Germany stood in for London and Martha's Vineyard due to Polanski's inability to legally travel to those places, as Polanski had fled the U.S. in 1978 after pleading guilty to unlawful sex with a 13-year-old girl. The majority of exteriors, set on Martha's Vineyard, were shot on the island of Sylt in the North Sea, and on the ferry MS SyltExpress. The harbor exterior were shot on both the German island of Sylt, and the Danish island of Rømø. The exterior set of the house where much of the film takes place, however, was built on the island of Usedom, in the Baltic Sea. Exteriors and interiors set at a publishing house in London were shot at Charlottenstrasse 47 in downtown Berlin (Mitte), while Strausberg Airport near Berlin stood in for the Vineyard airport. A few brief exterior shots for driving scenes were shot by a second unit in Massachusetts, without Polanski or the actors.

On his way to the Zurich Film Festival, Polanski was arrested by Swiss police in September 2009 at the request of the US and held for extradition on a 1978 arrest warrant. Due to Polanski's arrest, post-production was briefly put on hold, but he resumed and completed work from house arrest at his Swiss villa. He was unable to participate in the film's world premiere at the Berlinale festival on 12 February 2010.

Non-fictional allusions
Pierce Brosnan plays the character of Adam Lang, who has echoes of former British Prime Minister Tony Blair. The character is linked to the 2003 invasion of Iraq, the war on terror and the special relationship with the United States. The author of the book on which the film is based has said he was inspired at least in part by anger toward Blair's policies, and called for him to face war crimes trials.

Robert Pugh, who portrayed the former British Foreign Secretary, Richard Rycart, and Mo Asumang, who played the US Secretary of State, both physically resemble their real-life counterparts, Robin Cook and Condoleezza Rice. Like the fictional Rycart, Cook had foreign policy differences with the British Prime Minister. The old man living on Martha's Vineyard is a reference to Robert McNamara. Hatherton Corporation alludes to real-life Halliburton.

Release
The film premièred at the 60th Berlin International Film Festival on 12 February 2010, and was widely released throughout much of Europe during the following four weeks. It went on general release in the US on 19 March 2010 and in the UK on 16 April 2010.

For the US theatrical release, the dialogue was censored and re-dubbed with tamer language in order to meet the Motion Picture Association's qualifications for a PG-13 rating. The censored PG-13 version was later used for the US DVD and Blu-ray releases while the uncensored version was retained for most international DVD and Blu-ray releases.

Reception
The film has received positive reviews from critics. The website's critics consensus reads, "While it may lack the revelatory punch of Polanski's finest films, Ghost Writer benefits from stylish direction, a tense screenplay, and a strong central performance from Ewan McGregor." Another review aggregator, Metacritic, gave the film an average rating of 77% based on 35 reviews. At the end of the year, the film placed at #4 in both Film Comment and The Village Voice'''s annual critics' polls.

Critic Andrew Sarris wrote that the film "constitutes a miracle of artistic and psychological resilience." Roger Ebert gave the film a full four stars and declared it was "the work of a man who knows how to direct a thriller." Jim Hoberman of The Village Voice placed the film at #3 on his year-end list and wrote that "The Pianist had its moments, but Polanski hasn’t made a movie so sustained in the decades since The Tenant or even 1966’s Cul de Sac." Jonathan Rosenbaum would later write that "The Ghost Writer is easily Polanski’s best film since Bitter Moon, and certainly his most masterful." Political analyst William Bradley dubbed it "one of the best films I've seen in recent years" in a review for The Huffington Post that dealt with the film's artistic and political dimensions. The Guardian said "Roman Polanski's deft take on Robert Harris's political thriller is the director's most purely enjoyable film for years."

However, John Rentoul from the UK's liberal The Independent, who describes himself as an "ultra Blairite with a slavish admiration for Tony", and John Rosenthal, from the conservative Pajamas Media, both denounced the film because it was made with financial support from the German government. Rentoul also criticized Polanski describing the film as "propaganda" and a "Blair hating movie".

Keith Uhlich of Time Out New York named The Ghost Writer the second-best film of 2010, describing it as "what an expertly executed thriller is supposed to be."

Awards

The movie has won numerous awards, particularly for Roman Polanski as director, Ewan McGregor in the lead role, and Olivia Williams as Ruth Lang.

See also
2010 in film
British films of 2010
List of films set in London
List of films set in New England
List of fictional prime ministers of the United Kingdom
List of thriller filmsRoman de Gare'' (France, 2006), by Claude Lelouch (who appears as Hervé Picard), also about a ghost writer.

References

External links

2010 films
2010s political thriller films
2010 thriller drama films
British political thriller films
British thriller drama films
2010s English-language films
Films about writers
French political thriller films
Films based on British novels
Films directed by Roman Polanski
Films produced by Roman Polanski
Films set in London
Films set in Martha's Vineyard
Films shot in Denmark
Films shot in Germany
German political thriller films
Films with screenplays by Roman Polanski
Summit Entertainment films
Cultural depictions of Tony Blair
Babelsberg Studio films
European Film Awards winners (films)
Films whose director won the Best Director César Award
Films whose director won the Best Director Lumières Award
Films scored by Alexandre Desplat
English-language French films
English-language German films
Films à clef
Ghostwriting in fiction
2010 drama films
Films set in Massachusetts
Films set in Washington, D.C.
Films shot at Babelsberg Studios
2010s British films
2010s French films
2010s German films